The 2000 IBF World Junior Championships was an international badminton tournament held in Guangzhou, China from 3-11 November 2000. China sweep all the title in the team and individual events.

Team competition
A total of 24 countries competed at the first team competition in BWF World Junior Championships.

Medalists

Individual competition

Medalists

Results

Boys' singles

Girls' singles

Boys' doubles

Girls' doubles

Mixed doubles

Medal account

References

External links
World Junior Championships at Badminton.de

BWF World Junior Championships
World Junior Championships, 2000
Ibf World Junior Championships, 2000
Badminton tournaments in China
International sports competitions hosted by China